Johan van der Meulen (11 January 1915, Breda - 13 September 2005, Breda), better known by his pseudonym John O'Mill (a jocular translation of his given name, as if O' stands for "of the"), was a Dutch author mostly known for his wordplay and limericks, and for using a macaronic combination of Dutch and English words and sentence structures he called "Double Dutch" (itself a pun on various meanings of this phrase). Double Dutch appears English, but it cannot be fully understood without knowledge of Dutch, because it is based on the literal translation of Dutch idioms into English and the similarity in sound of certain words and expressions. O'Mill, who was until 1975 a teacher of English at the public high school "Rijks-HBS" at Breda (North Brabant), was inspired by the clumsy English used by his students.

Books
Lyrical Laria (1956)
Rollicky Rhymes (1957) in Dutch and double Dutch (D.&d.D.)
Curious Couplets (1958) & preposterous prose (D.&d.D.)
Tafellarijmvet (1958) (table drawer rhyming grease)
Bonny Ballads (1959) medley of verse and worse
Mixture (1961)
Louter Leuter (1962) (nothing but chatter)
Cocktail (1963)
Medical mess (1965)
Puure Piffel (1965) (pure drivel)
Complex (1965)
Op deuren en glazen (1973) (on doors and glasses)
Popsy Poems (1975) pre-popsylated poetry (D.&d.D.)
Literary Larycook Dutch:Lariekoek = nonsense(1977)
Loony lyrics (1981)
Penfruit Prullaria (1983) Dutch:Prullaria = bits and pieces
Boloney belletrie (1984) (become sleepy unless med. description)
Apologische spreekwoorden (1984) (apological proverbs)

References 
 Summary at the Koninklijke Bibliotheek
 The ratmepper of Hamelin
 Summary at Schrijversinfo

1915 births
2005 deaths
20th-century Dutch poets
20th-century Dutch male writers
Dutch male poets
People from Breda
Macaronic language